Levon Pashabezyan (born November 10, 1986) is an Armenian taekwondo athlete.

Pashabezyan won a gold medal at the 2003 Youth European Taekwondo Championships.

See also
Armenian Taekwondo Federation
List of Taekwondo practitioners

References

External links
 Profile from Taekwondo Data

1986 births
Living people
Armenian male taekwondo practitioners
21st-century Armenian people